This is a list of results for the electoral district of Perth in Western Australian state elections from the district's creation in 1890 until the present.

Members for Perth

Election results

Elections in the 2020s

Elections in the 2010s

Elections in the 2000s

Elections in the 1990s

Elections in the 1980s

 Preferences were not distributed.

Elections in the 1970s

Elections in the 1960s

Elections in the 1940s

 Preferences were not distributed.

 Preferences were not distributed.

Elections in the 1930s

 Preferences were not distributed.

Elections in the 1920s

 Preferences were not distributed.

|- style="background-color:#E9E9E9"
! colspan="6" style="text-align:left;" |After distribution of preferences

Elections in the 1910s

Elections in the 1900s

Elections in the 1890s

References

 
 State Electoral Office (Western Australia). Legislative Assembly : statistics relating to the general elections. Government Printer, various years (1917–1983).

Western Australian state electoral results by district